"The Angel" is a poem written by the English poet William Blake.  It was published as part of his collection Songs of Experience in 1794.

Poem

Uses
This is one of Blake's poems quoted by a character in David Almond's Skellig.

Notes

Gallery

1794 poems
Songs of Innocence and of Experience